Manegaon is a census town  in Balaghat district in the Indian state of Madhya Pradesh.
Total papulation :2045
House hold 465

Manegaon Population by Sex 

There are total of 989 male person's & 1056 Females & a total 
Number Of 225 children's below 6 year in Manegaon 
The percentage of male population 
Is 48.36%
The percentage of female population is 51.64%
The percentage of child population is 11.00%

Geography
It has an average elevation of 298 metres (977 feet).

Demographics
 India census, Manegaon had a population of 9174. Males constitute 52% of the population and females 48%. Manegaon has an average literacy rate of 78%, higher than the national average of 59.5%: male literacy is 83%, and female literacy is 72%. In Manegaon, 10% of the population is under 6 years of age.

References

Cities and towns in Jabalpur district